Restless Wind is the 19th album by pianist George Winston and 15th solo piano album, released on May 3, 2019. The eleven-song collection includes his interpretations of music by Sam Cooke, The Doors, Stephen Stills, George and Ira Gershwin and Country Joe McDonald.

Track listing

References

External links
Liner Notes (PDF)

2019 albums
George Winston albums
RCA Records albums